Clear Creek Township is one of the fifteen townships of Ashland County, Ohio, United States. The 2010 census found 2,276 people in the township, 1,492 of whom lived in the unincorporated portions of the township.

Geography
Located in the northwestern part of the county, it borders the following townships:
Ruggles Township - north
Orange Township - east
Montgomery Township - southeast corner
Milton Township - south
Weller Township, Richland County - southwest corner
Butler Township, Richland County - west

Two villages are located in Clear Creek Township: Bailey Lakes in the east, and Savannah in the northeast.

Name and history
It is the only Clear Creek Township statewide. Clear Creek Township was formed out of the north half of Milton Township on 15 October 1818, and was originally six miles square.  Upon the formation of Ashland County in 1846, Clear Creek was again divided, four columns of sections on the east being included in Ashland County, the other two columns remaining in Richland.  The last division reduced the township to its present dimensions -- four by six miles.

Government
The township is governed by a three-member board of trustees, who are elected in November of odd-numbered years to a four-year term beginning on the following January 1. Two are elected in the year after the presidential election and one is elected in the year before it. There is also an elected township fiscal officer, who serves a four-year term beginning on April 1 of the year after the election, which is held in November of the year before the presidential election. Vacancies in the fiscal officership or on the board of trustees are filled by the remaining trustees.

References

External links
County website

Townships in Ashland County, Ohio
Townships in Ohio